Marko Tešija (born 14 January 1992) is a Croatian professional footballer who plays as a midfielder for Dugopolje.

Club career

FK Senica
Tešija made his professional Fortuna Liga debut for Senica against FC Spartak Trnava on 21 July 2018.

References

External links
 FK Senica official club profile 
 
 Futbalnet profile 
 

1992 births
Living people
Footballers from Split, Croatia
Association football midfielders
Croatian footballers
Croatia youth international footballers
RNK Split players
NK Dugopolje players
NK Zadar players
HŠK Zrinjski Mostar players
NK Zagreb players
NK Rudeš players
ND Gorica players
FK Senica players
FC Spartak Trnava players
Xanthi F.C. players
FC Brașov (2021) players
Croatian Football League players
First Football League (Croatia) players
Slovenian PrvaLiga players
Slovak Super Liga players
Super League Greece 2 players
Premier League of Bosnia and Herzegovina players
Liga II players
Croatian expatriate footballers
Expatriate footballers in Slovenia
Croatian expatriate sportspeople in Slovenia
Expatriate footballers in Slovakia
Croatian expatriate sportspeople in Slovakia
Expatriate footballers in Greece
Croatian expatriate sportspeople in Greece
Expatriate footballers in Bosnia and Herzegovina
Croatian expatriate sportspeople in Bosnia and Herzegovina
Expatriate footballers in Romania
Croatian expatriate sportspeople in Romania